Darko Raić-Sudar (born 7 November 1972 in Bruchsal) is a retired Croatian footballer and football manager.

In 2016 he started coaching career as the caretaker manager of Croatian First Football League team NK Istra 1961.

In also year, he became the Istra 1961 assistant manager of Marijo Tot, and later of Goran Tomić.

Following the pre-season of the 2017–18 season he was appointed the head coach, after sacked of Marijo Tot. He was sacked in July 2018.

Honours
Croatian Cup (1):
1998–99

References

External links
 
 Stats at the official website of Bnei Yehuda

1972 births
Living people
People from Bruchsal
Association football midfielders
Croatian footballers
HNK Cibalia players
NK Osijek players
Maccabi Netanya F.C. players
Bnei Yehuda Tel Aviv F.C. players
Hapoel Nof HaGalil F.C. players
NK Istra 1961 players
Croatian Football League players
Israeli Premier League players
Liga Leumit players
Croatian expatriate footballers
Expatriate footballers in Israel
Croatian expatriate sportspeople in Israel
Croatian football managers
NK Istra 1961 managers